Kevin Long may refer to:

 Kevin Long (skateboarder) (born 1984), American professional skateboarder
 Kevin Long (offensive lineman) (born 1975), American footballer
 Kevin Long (running back) (born 1955), former football player with the USFL Chicago Blitz (and later the NFL)
 Kevin Long (baseball) (born 1966), American baseball coach
 Kevin Long (artist), American artist known for his work with Palladium Books
 Kevin Long (footballer) (born 1990), Irish footballer